Beso may refer to:
Beso (song), a song by Elvana Gjata
Beso, or beso-beso, a form of cheek kissing in the Philippines
Beso, nickname of Georgian revolutionary and Soviet politician Vissarion Lominadze
Beso (footballer), nickname of Egyptian footballer Mohamed Ahmed

See also
"Un Beso", a 2005 single from Aventura
El Beso (disambiguation)